Abatus koehleri is a species of sea urchin of the family Schizasteridae. Their armour is covered with spines. It was first scientifically described in 1908 by Koehler. It is known from the South Orkneys.

See also 
 Abatus cordatus
 Abatus curvidens
 Abatus ingens

References 

Spatangoida
Animals described in 1836